L.A. Divine is the sixth studio album by American indie rock band Cold War Kids. It was released on April 7, 2017 through Capitol Records. It is the first album to feature lead guitarist David Quon, replacing Dann Gallucci.

Background
The album name, a lyric from a song that did not make the record, reflects the recent rise of interest in Los Angeles "as a place where culture, restaurants and things are happening".

On the first single, "Love Is Mystical", Nathan Willett stated that "When you tour as much as we do, and you get back in the studio in the middle of it, you're kinda numb, it is hard to get that feeling back and this song was the real breakthrough. It's about supernatural love – looking for inspiration and meaning, surrendering to feeling, love calling out your name; that journey we must go on to find it."

Singles
The first single from the album, "Love Is Mystical", was released on February 2, 2017. The second single, "Can We Hang On?" was released on March 2, 2017. The third single, "Restless", was released on April 6, 2017. The fourth single, "So Tied Up" featuring Bishop Briggs, was released on August 8, 2017.

Critical reception

AllMusic's Heather Phares found the album as a whole "a little less consistent than Hold My Home," with its needless interludes and the band's overwhelming intensity but gave praise for recapturing that record's "solidly anthemic sound" while adding a bit of pop music to it that's "reminiscent of Fun," concluding that: "Nevertheless, L.A. Divine shows that Cold War Kids continue to expand their range – and if they're becoming more accessible with each album, it's on their own terms." Paste writer Scott Heisel found the album "frustrating in its monotonous insistence on making everything sound the same, simultaneously trying to land every single song on SiriusXM's Alt Nation channel but not focusing enough on developing the personality of any one track." Grant Rindner of DIY commented on the band's attempt to duplicate the sound they had with "First" saying "there's logic to what's going on here but it still feels unnatural." Rindner added that the record was "simply too rigid for Willett to shine", commenting that drummer Joe Plummer was less subtle in giving him "predictable, percussive grids that give his voice a jarringly artificial, almost showtune quality."

Track listing

Personnel
 Nathan Willett – lead vocals, piano, guitar
 Matt Maust – bass guitar
 David Quon – guitar, keyboards, percussion
 Joe Plummer – drums, percussion
 Matthew Schwartz – keyboards, guitar, backing vocals

Charts

References

2017 albums
Cold War Kids albums
Capitol Records albums
Albums produced by Lars Stalfors